William Slinn (13 December 1826 – 19 June 1888) was an English first-class cricketer, who played for Sheffield Cricket Club (aka Yorkshire) 1861–62; and for Yorkshire County Cricket Club 1863–64. In other first-class games, he played for the United All-England Eleven (1860), an England "Next XIV" (1860), the North of England (1863), and the All-England Eleven (1864).

Slinn was born in Sheffield and died, aged 61, in June 1888 in Wortley, Leeds. He was a right-arm fast roundarm bowler. He took 111 wickets in his nineteen first-class matches at an average of 13.20 with a best analysis of eight for 33 against Surrey. He took five wickets in an innings nine times, and ten wickets in a match on four occasions. He was less successful as a right-handed batsman, scoring 46 runs at an average of only 2.00, with a best score of 11. When fielding, he held eleven catches.

Besides Yorkshire, he played county cricket matches for Buckinghamsire, Rutland, Monmouthshire, Northamptonshire, and a single match in 1865 for Shropshire.

References

1826 births
1888 deaths
All-England Eleven cricketers
English cricketers
North v South cricketers
Cricketers from Sheffield
United All-England Eleven cricketers
Yorkshire cricketers
English cricketers of 1826 to 1863
English cricketers of 1864 to 1889